Shane O'Driscoll (born 10 September 1992) is an Irish lightweight rower. He won a gold medal at the 2017 World Rowing Championships in Sarasota, Florida with the lightweight men's coxless pair.

References

1992 births
Living people
Irish male rowers
World Rowing Championships medalists for Ireland
21st-century Irish people